Judith Williams Jagdmann (born November 3, 1958) is an American attorney who served as the 43rd Attorney General of Virginia. Elected by the Virginia General Assembly to fill the vacancy created when Jerry Kilgore resigned to run for Governor, she remained in office until the election of Bob McDonnell. She has served on the Virginia State Corporation Commission since 2006.

Jagdmann is the daughter of the late Glen Morgan Williams, a longtime judge of the United States District Court for the Western District of Virginia.

References

1958 births
Living people
Virginia Republicans
University of Virginia alumni
University of Richmond School of Law alumni
People from Norton, Virginia
Virginia Attorneys General
Women in Virginia politics
21st-century American politicians
21st-century American women politicians